Eodorcadion tuvense is a species of beetle in the family Cerambycidae. It was described by Plavilstshikov in 1958.

References

Dorcadiini
Beetles described in 1958